The term "saliva" may refer to:

Saliva, spittle
Saliva (band), an American rock band
Saliva (album), the band's debut album
"Saliva" (MF Doom song)
"Saliva" (Thalía song)
Səliva, a village in Azerbaijan
Saliba language (also referred to as Sáliva), an indigenous Colombian language